Georgine Darcy (October 14, 1930 – July 18, 2004) was an American dancer and actress best known for her role as "Miss Torso" in the 1954 Alfred Hitchcock film Rear Window. She also had a regular role in the 1960–1961 sitcom Harrigan and Son.

Early life
Darcy was born Georgine Werger in Brooklyn, New York, to George Werger and Evelyn Euler Werger. She had one older brother. Her father was a laborer in a glass factory,  who died before 1940.

Career
Darcy's mother urged her to become a stripper, to make a "fast buck". She studied ballet, and danced with the New York City Ballet, and was a model. At age 16, she left home and traveled by bus to California.

In 1954, she was cast in Rear Window. She did not even know Hitchcock and did not consider herself an actress. Hitchcock selected her based on a publicity photo of her wearing a black leotard and green feather boa.  In Rear Window, she played one of the neighbors of protagonist L.B. Jefferies (Jimmy Stewart), a wheelchair-bound photographer who passes the time spying on the other tenants of his neighborhood. Her nameless character, who was dubbed "Miss Torso", practiced her dance moves in a skimpy top and a pair of pink shorts with a 21-inch waistband, courtesy of costume designer Edith Head. She had no lines in the film until the end when she greets Stanley who has returned from military service.

During filming, Hitchcock asked her what kinds of pie she liked and disliked. She told him she loathed pumpkin pie. When it came time to film her character's reaction to finding a strangled dog, he presented her with pumpkin pie served with "crude Cockney jokes" to prompt an adverse response. On the last day of filming, Hitchcock and some of the cast presented her with a cake in the shape of her voluptuous figure. "It had the breasts and everything!" she said.

Hitchcock told Darcy that she should get an agent and that if she studied Anton Chekov in Europe, he could make her a movie star when she returned.  She ignored both pieces of advice and thought he was joking about the latter. She was paid $350 for her work in Rear Window and had a sporadic acting career. Her most substantive role was in the Chubby Checker film Don't Knock the Twist (1962). She played Madge Albright, a "dancing firestorm" who is part of a brother-sister dance team. She also appeared in the movies Women and Bloody Terror (1970) and The Delta Factor (1970).

On television, she played Gypsy, an irreverent secretary for the title father-son team of lawyers in Harrigan and Son, played by Pat O'Brien and Roger Perry. She had guest appearances on Lee Marvin's M Squad, the Westinghouse Desilu Playhouse and Mannix.

Darcy was the subject of the 2004 documentary short film Remembering Miss Torso by director Malcolm Venville.

She died of natural causes and was survived by her husband of 30 years, actor Byron Palmer. She was said to be the last surviving credited cast member of Rear Window. However, that was not true as Frank Cady, who appeared as the Thorwalds' upstairs neighbor, survived until 2012, and Rand Harper, who played "Harry," the honeymooning groom, died in 2016. Harry Landers, who played the uncredited role of Miss Lonelyheart's guest, died in 2017.

Filmography
 Love Me Madly (1954) 
 Rear Window (1954) as Miss Torso
 Don't Knock the Twist (1962) as Madge Albright
 Women and Bloody Terror (1970) as Lauren Worthington
 The Delta Factor (1970) as Party Girl

Footnotes

References

External links

 

1936 births
2004 deaths
People from Brooklyn
Actresses from New York City
American film actresses
American female dancers
American television actresses
Dancers from New York (state)
20th-century American dancers
20th-century American actresses
21st-century American women